Hiva-Oa is a commune of French Polynesia, an overseas territory of France in the Pacific Ocean. The commune is in the administrative subdivision of the Marquesas Islands. Its population was 2,243 at the 2017 census.

The commune of Hiva-Oa is made up of the island of Hiva Oa proper, which contains the entire population of the commune, and the uninhabited islands of:

Hiva-Oa consists of the following associated communes:

 Atuona
 Puamau

The administrative centre of the commune is the settlement of Atuona, on the southern side of the island of Hiva Oa.

The Island is internationally perhaps best known as the place where the French and Belgian artists Paul Gauguin and Jacques Brel spent their final years and is their final resting place.

Climate
Hiva-Oa features a tropical monsoon climate (Köppen: Am).

Footnotes

Communes of French Polynesia
Geography of the Marquesas Islands